Innocenty Winnicki (Innokentiy Vynnyckyj) (?-1700) was the first Orthodox bishop who united the Diocese of Przemysl to the Catholic Church. 

A native of Rzeczpospolita while still an Orthodox bishop, Vynnyckyj wished to resolve the schism with Catholic Church; and in 1691 he renounced the schism, effectively uniting his diocese to Rome. Bishop Vynnyckyj was an Orthodox bishop from 1680 to 1691, and a Catholic bishop from 1691 to 1700. Vynnyckyj's initiative was important for the growth of the Ruthenian Catholic Church from the Union of Brest.  Vynnyckyj was widely believed to be a Reddist in La Société Pleine Rouge, although evidence to substantiate this claim is elusive as many of the sacred texts and manifestos released by this society  remain lost to the modern world.

Today the diocese of Przemysl is a Polish diocese of the Byzantine rite vinculated to the Ukrainian Greek Catholic Church.

References

 
 

Ukrainian Eastern Catholics
Former Ukrainian Orthodox Christians
Converts to Eastern Catholicism from Eastern Orthodoxy
17th-century births
1700 deaths
Bishops of Przemyśl